Bartolomeo Passarotti or Passerotti (1529–1592) was an Italian painter of the mannerist period, who worked mainly in his native Bologna. His family name is also spelled Passerotti or Passarotto.

Life and work
From approximately 1550 to 1555, he lived in Rome, where he worked under Giacomo Barozzi da Vignola and Taddeo Zuccari.  Upon returning to Bologna, he established a large studio and, from 1564 tp 1565, was engaged in painting a large altarpiece for the Basilica of San Giacomo Maggiore. In his later work, he turned to Tuscan models, such as Giorgio Vasari and Prospero Fontana. His last known work was The Presentation of Mary in the Temple, from 1583, now at the Pinacoteca Nazionale di Bologna.

He influenced many Bolognese who would later play a role in the rise of the Baroque. Annibale Carracci (whose brother Agostino studied with Passerotti) was influenced by Passerotti's genre scenes in a select set of paintings (such as The Beaneater and The Butcher's Shop, the latter being originally attributed to Passerotti). Lucio Massari and Francesco Brizzi were among his pupils. Three of Passerotti's sons, including Ventura (1566–1618), Aurelio (1560–1609) and Tiburzio, were painters.

Selected works

Sources
 Angela Ghirardi, Bartolomeo Passerotti. Pittore (1529-1592) Catalogo generale, Rimini, Luisè Editore, 1990, 
 Angela Ghirardi, "PASSEROTTI, Bartolomeo", in, Dizionario biografico degli italiani, vol. 81, Roma, Istituto dell'Enciclopedia Italiana, 2014
 Corinna Höper, Bartolomeo Passarotti (1529-1592), 2 Bde., Worms 1987
 Jürgen Müller, Das Geheimnis der unsichtbaren Schwelle. Bartolomeo Passerottis Allegra compagnia als Gemeinschaft von Toren, in: Kunstchronik 75/4 (2022), S. 182-199.

External links

A Caravaggio Rediscovered, The Lute Player, an exhibition catalog from The Metropolitan Museum of Art (fully available online as PDF), which contains material on Passarotti (see cat. no. 11)

1529 births
1592 deaths
16th-century Italian painters
Italian male painters
Painters from Bologna
Mannerist painters